Torp is the surname of:

 Alf Torp (1853–1916), Norwegian philologist
 Ane Dahl Torp (born 1975), Norwegian actress
 Arne Torp (born 1942), Norwegian professor
 Carl-Erik Torp (born 1984), Norwegian association footballer
 Else Torp (born 1968), Danish soprano
 Ernst Torp (1900–1988), Norwegian architect
 Fredrik Torp (born 1937), Norwegian architect
 Harald Torp (1890–1972), Norwegian journalist and politician
 Jette Torp (born 1964), Danish singer
 Leif Torp (1897–1991), Norwegian architect
 Linn Torp (born 1977), Norwegian cyclist
 Maren Bolette Torp (1876–1989), Norwegian supercentenarian
 Martin Torp (born 1992), Norwegian association footballer
 Nichlas Torp (born 1989), Swedish hockey player
 Nikolaj Torp Larsen (born 1973), Danish musician
 Niels A. Torp (born 1940), Norwegian architect, owner of the architectural firm Niels Torp AS
 Oscar Torp (1893–1958), former Prime Minister of Norway
 Reidar Torp (1922–2017), Norwegian soldier
 Trine Torp (born 1970), Danish politician

See also
 Anisette Torp-Lind (born 1971), Danish figure skater